The Blas de Lezo-class cruisers''' were a group of two cruisers, built for the Spanish Navy in the 1920s. The ships were ordered in 1915 but construction proceeded slowly due to material shortages during World War I. The ships were built by Sociedad Española de Construcción Naval in Ferrol and showed considerable British design influence, resembling contemporary British C-class cruisers.Mendez Nunez was reconstructed into an anti-aircraft cruiser in 1944. She was re-armed with 8 - 120mm Vickers anti-aircraft guns in single mountings, 4 × 2 37mm and 2 × 4 20mm light AA guns of German origin. The superstructure was completely rebuilt and fitted with modern fire control equipment. Two triple banks of torpedo tubes were retained.

Ships

Blaz de Lezo
[[File:Blas de.jpg|thumb|left|Blas de Lezos shakedown in 1923]]Blas de Lezo was named after Admiral Blas de Lezo. In early 1926, she supported the transatlantic flight from Spain to Buenos Aires, Argentina, of a four-man Spanish Air Force crew led by pilot Major Ramón Franco – the brother of future Spanish caudillo Francisco Franco – and including copilot/navigator Captain Julio Ruiz de Alda Miqueleiz in the Dornier Do J Wal ("Whale") flying boat Plus Ultra ("Farther Still"), carrying spares and other equipment for the flight. She struck a rock near Cape Finisterre in 1932 and sank in deep water.

Méndez NúñezMéndez Núñez'' was named after Admiral Casto Méndez Núñez. She was based in Equatorial Guinea at the start of the Spanish Civil War and she returned home to fight for the Spanish Republican Navy. In 1939, following the Cartagena Uprising, she was interned in Bizerte and seized by the French authorities. She was later handed to Francoist Spain, serving until 1963.

References

Bibliography

External links 

Cruiser classes